Richard Powers is an expert in American social dance, noted for his choreographies for dozens of stage productions and films, and his workshops in Paris, Rome, Prague, London, Venice, Geneva, St. Petersburg and Tokyo as well as across the U.S. and Canada. He has been researching and reconstructing historic social dances for twenty-five years and is currently a full-time instructor at Stanford University Dance Division. He teaches a variety of social dance history and practicum classes for the dance division of the Stanford University Drama Department. He joined the Dance Faculty in 1992 and serves as a faculty liaison to the Friends of Dance at Stanford organization.

Richard co-founded the Flying Cloud Academy of Vintage Dance (1981) to produce large-scale monthly recreations of Victorian and Ragtime Balls. Formed the Flying Cloud Troupe, a 30-member performing company (1982) and co-founded the supporting Fleeting Moments Waltz & Quickstep Orchestra.

Richard started and directed the Stanford Vintage Dance Ensemble (1992) and serves as an advisor and choreographer for the Swingtime Dance Troupe.

Before his tenure as a dance professor, Richard was a successful inventor. He currently holds patents for eight products including the modern tampon inserter.

Recognition
Powers was selected by the Centennial Issue of Stanford Magazine as one of Stanford University's most notable graduates of its first century and was awarded the Lloyd W. Dinkelspiel Award for distinctive and exceptional contributions to education at Stanford University (1999).

Recipient of the Post-Corbett Award, Cincinnati's foremost arts recognition (1992).

Choreographies in film
Ragtime era dance for the 1989 film Cold Sassy Tree
19th century ballroom dances for the 1989 film North and South
Ragtime era dance for the 1994 film Spring Awakening
Victorian ballroom dances for the 1986 TV film Mrs. Perkins' Ball

Extended Links
Richard Powers Faculty Page
Swingtime Official Website
Powers' biography
Powers' writing about dance and dancing
Richard Powers’ homepage

References

Living people
Culture of San Francisco
American choreographers
Dance historians
Dance teachers
Stanford University Department of Drama faculty
Stanford University alumni
Lindy Hop
Year of birth missing (living people)